Peter Orávik (born 18 December 1988) is a Slovak footballer who plays as a midfielder for the Fortuna liga club ViOn Zlaté Moravce.

References

External links
FC ViOn profile 
Corgoň Liga profile 

Sport.sk profile 

1988 births
Living people
Sportspeople from Považská Bystrica
Slovak footballers
FK Žiar nad Hronom players
MFK Dolný Kubín players
FC ViOn Zlaté Moravce players
Association football midfielders
Slovak Super Liga players
3. Liga (Slovakia) players